Chilov (also spelt Zhiloy and Jiloi) is an island in the Caspian Sea.

Geography

Administratively Chilov Island belongs to the Khazar district of Baku.

History
Oil and gas deposits were discovered near Chilov island by Russian Rear Admiral Count Mark Voynovich while he led an expedition to the Caspian Sea in 1781.

References

Caspian Sea Biodiversity Project

External links

Weather reports for Chilov

Islands of Azerbaijan
Islands of the Caspian Sea
Absheron Archipelago